Apistogramma regani is a species of South American dwarf cichlid.
It is a freshwater fish found in the lower Rio Negro basin in the Amazon.
The specific name is in honour of the British ichthyologist Charles Tate Regan.

References

regani
Fish described in 1980
Taxa named by Sven O. Kullander